"Solomon Bites the Worm" is a song by The Bluetones, released as the first single from their second album, 1998's Return to the Last Chance Saloon.  It reached number ten in the UK Singles Chart. In 2006, it was included on the band's compilation album, A Rough Outline: The Singles & B-Sides 95 - 03.  The lyrics are based on the nursery rhyme "Solomon Grundy".

Track listing
CD
"Solomon Bites the Worm"
"I Was a Teenage Jesus" 
"I Walked All Night"

7"
"Solomon Bites the Worm"
"I Was a Teenage Jesus"

The Bluetones songs
1998 singles
Song recordings produced by Hugh Jones (producer)
Songs based on children's songs
1998 songs
Songs written by Eds Chesters
Songs written by Adam Devlin
Songs written by Mark Morriss
Songs written by Scott Morriss